The Weyburn Security Bank Building (also referred to as the Imperial Bank of Canada Building) is located at 76 - 3rd Street in Weyburn, Saskatchewan, Canada and is a two-storey building with a glazed terracotta façade. The Minneapolis-based architectural firm of Long, Lamoureux and Long designed the building in a  Classical Revival and Chicago School that was more representative of banks in the Western US. The building is a designated Provincial Heritage Property. The building was built in 1910 for the Weyburn Security Bank that merged with the Imperial Bank of Canada in 1931.

References 

Commercial buildings completed in 1910
Weyburn
Canadian Imperial Bank of Commerce